Kaim-Saal was a concert hall in Maxvorstadt, Munich, Germany. Built in 1895, it was renamed Tonhalle in 1905. It was destroyed in 1944 in the Bombing of Munich in World War II.

External links

Buildings and structures in Munich
Maxvorstadt